Chicago XIV is the twelfth studio album by the American band Chicago, released in 1980. Recorded at a time of waning interest in the band, Chicago XIV remains one of Chicago's poorest-selling albums, failing to reach Gold certification by the Recording Industry Association of America (RIAA), and was deemed a commercial flop. It is also notable for being their last studio album with Columbia Records, and the last one to feature percussionist Laudir de Oliveira.

Background
After the commercial and critical disappointment of Chicago 13, and the departure of guitarist Donnie Dacus, Chicago decided that a new strategy was in order. Chris Pinnick played guitar on the sessions and would later become an official member. The band also tried a new producer, this time Tom Dowd, who had worked with Aretha Franklin, Cream, and Eric Clapton. With Dowd taking the reins, and with Chicago abandoning the dance club sound that permeated their previous album, the band recorded a lean, more streamlined record which would, predictably, be called Chicago XIV. Possibly designed as a response to the under-produced, new wave efforts on the radio at the time, the album was the band's least orchestrated effort to date.

Artwork, packaging
Designed by John Berg, art director of Columbia/CBS Records, the album cover front features an album-cover-size black thumbprint on a white background, with the Chicago logo embedded in the whorls. The album cover back also features an album-cover-size black fingerprint or thumbprint on white background, but without the embedded Chicago logo. The inside dust cover is white with black printing that lists album credits, and also has at the edge four life-size black fingerprints from a right hand on the credits side of the liner, and a corresponding life-size black thumbprint at the edge of the back of the liner. This small thumbprint also has the Chicago logo embedded in the whorls. Berg was nominated for a Grammy Award for Best Album Package for this album. The cover was included in a 2012-2013 exhibit of Berg's album covers at Guild Hall of East Hampton. The cover artwork is in the permanent collection of The Museum of Modern Art in New York City.

Release and aftermath
With four solo writing credits and one cowriting credit among the ten songs on the album, Peter Cetera took on a greater songwriting role in the band than in the past. His compositions included a mix of ballads, pop and rock songs. Robert Lamm turned in the rockers "Manipulation" and "I'd Rather Be Rich" (a song from 1975); James Pankow delivered the uptempo – if downbeat – "The American Dream"; and Lamm and Danny Seraphine co-wrote "Thunder and Lightning". "Birthday Boy" marked the final collaboration between Seraphine and his songwriting partner Hawk Wolinski. Like Chicago 13 before it, Chicago XIV failed to improve Chicago's fortunes. To the record-buying public, Chicago's image was out of touch in 1980, and once the new album was released, it became clear that any attempt to win new fans would be in vain.

Columbia Records was increasingly disappointed with the poor sales performance of the band. Chicago XIV went unnoticed upon release and bombed, reaching only number seventy-one on the Billboard 200 chart in the US, and disappeared quickly. Again, there were no singles hits, with "Thunder and Lightning" stalling below the top fifty and "Song For You" failing to chart. Chicago also saw a poor attendance in many venues during the supporting tour. Realizing that the relationship had soured considerably, Columbia Records terminated their contract with Chicago with a buyout of approximately $2 million. In 1982, Robert Lamm recalled, 

As a settlement to ending the arrangement early, Columbia released the band's second greatest-hits album and jettisoned them from the label. The money from the settlement was used to record Chicago 16 independently, while the band shopped for a new label (eventually they signed with Warner). Realizing that the Latin/Jazz percussion style evident in the latter half of the previous decade no longer fit with their "more pop-oriented sound", while beginning work on Chicago 16, the album Chicago XIV signaled the end of percussionist Laudir de Oliveira's tenure with the band after nine years. Peter Cetera, meanwhile, concentrated on his first self-titled solo album during the hiatus.

In 2003, Chicago XIV was remastered and reissued by Rhino Records, with three outtakes from the sessions, "Doin' Business" (which first appeared on the 1991 4-Disc anthology Group Portrait), "Live It Up", and "Soldier of Fortune" as bonus tracks.

Track listing
Track titles, track order, and writers for tracks one through ten from 1980 vinyl LP liner.

Personnel

Chicago 
 Peter Cetera – bass, lead and backing vocals
 Laudir de Oliveira – percussion
 Robert Lamm – keyboards, lead and backing vocals
 Lee Loughnane – trumpet
 James Pankow – trombone
 Walter Parazaider – woodwinds
 Danny Seraphine – drums

Additional musicians 
 Ian Underwood – keyboards
 David "Hawk" Wolinski – keyboards
 Mark Goldenberg – guitars
 Chris Pinnick – guitars

Production 
 Produced by Tom Dowd
 Production Coordination – Schatzi Hagerman
 Engineered and Mixed by Michael Carnevale
 Assistant Engineers – Ricky Delena, Karat Faye and Bill Freesh.
 Mastered by Bernie Grundman at A&M Studios (Hollywood, CA).
 Design – John Berg
 Artwork and Cover Lettering – Gerard Huerta

Charts

Notes

References

Chicago (band) albums
1980 albums
Albums produced by Tom Dowd
Columbia Records albums
Albums recorded at Record Plant (Los Angeles)